A lead time is the latency between the initiation and completion of a process. For example, the lead time between the placement of an order and delivery of new cars by a given manufacturer might be between 2 weeks and 6 months, depending on various particularities. One business dictionary defines "manufacturing lead time" as the total time required to manufacture an item, including order preparation time, queue time, setup time, run time, move time, inspection time, and put-away time. For make-to-order products, it is the time between release of an order and the production and shipment that fulfill that order. For make-to-stock products, it is the time taken from the release of an order to production and receipt into finished goods inventory.

Supply chain management
A conventional definition of lead time in a supply chain management context is the time from the moment the customer places an order (the moment the supplier learns of the requirement) to the moment it is ready for delivery. In the absence of finished goods or intermediate (work in progress) inventory, it is the time it takes to actually manufacture the order without any inventory other than raw materials. The Chartered Institute of Procurement & Supply identifies "total lead time" as a combination of "internal lead time" (the time required for the buying organisation's internal processes to progress from identification of a need to the issue of a purchase order) and "external lead time" (the time required for the supplying organisation's processes, including any development required, manufacture, dispatch and delivery).

Manufacturing
In the manufacturing environment, lead time has the same definition as that of Supply Chain Management, but it includes the time required to ship the parts from the supplier. Shipping time is included because the manufacturing company needs to know when the parts will be available for material requirements planning purposes. It is also possible to include within lead time the time it takes for a company to process and have the part ready for manufacturing once it has been received. The time it takes a company to unload a product from a truck, inspect it, and move it into storage ("put-away time") is not trivial. With tight manufacturing constraints or when a company is using Just In Time manufacturing, it is important for supply chain to know how long their own internal processes take.

Lead time consists of:
 Preprocessing Lead Time (also known as "planning time" or "paperwork"): the time required to release a purchase order (if you buy an item) or create a job (if you manufacture an item), from the time you learn of the requirement.
 Processing Lead Time: the time required to procure or manufacture an item.
 Postprocessing Lead Time: the time to make a purchased item available in inventory from the time you receive it (including quarantine, inspection, etc.)

Example

Company A needs a part that can be manufactured in two days once Company B has received an order. It takes three days for company A to receive the part once shipped, and one additional day before the part is ready to go into manufacturing.
If Company A's Supply Chain calls Company B they will be quoted a lead time of 2 days for the part.
If Company A's Manufacturing division asks the Supply Chain division what the lead time is, they will be quoted 5 days since shipping will be included.
If a line worker asks the Manufacturing Division boss what the lead time is before the part is ready to be used, it will be 6 days because setup time will be included.

In more detail

Lead Time terminology has been defined in greater detail. The Supply Chain from customer order received to the moment the order is delivered is divided into five lead times.
 Order Lead Time - Time from customer order received to customer order delivered.
 Order Handling Time - Time from customer order received to sales order created.
 Manufacturing Lead Time - Time from sales order created to production finished (ready for delivery).
 Production Lead Time - Time from start of physical production of first submodule/part to production finished (ready for delivery).
 Delivery Lead Time - Time from production finished to customer order delivered.

Example 

A restaurant opens up and a customer walks in. A waiter guides him to a table, gives him the menu and asks what he would like to order. The customer selects a dish and the waiter writes it in his notepad. At that moment the customer has made an order which the restaurant has accepted – Order Lead Time and Order Handling Time have begun. Now the waiter marks the order in the cash register, rips the paper from the notepad, takes it into the kitchen and puts into the order queue. The order has been handled and is waiting in the factory (kitchen) for manufacturing. As there are no other customers, the waiter decides to stand outside the kitchen, by the door, waiting for the dish to be prepared and begins calculating Manufacturing Lead Time.

Meanwhile, the chef finishes what he was doing, takes the order from the queue, starts his clock as a mark for the start of Production Lead Time and begins cooking. The chef chops the vegetables, fries the meat and boils the pasta. When the dish is ready, the chef rings a bell and stops his clock. At the same time, the waiter stops calculating Manufacturing Lead Time and rushes through the kitchen door to get the food while it is hot.

When he picks it up, he begins timing the Delivery Lead Time that ends when the dish is served to the customer, who can now happily say that the Order Lead Time was shorter than he had expected.

Possible ways of shortening the lead time: 

To best meet the customer needs, a company should work towards the shortest possible lead time in manufacturing, production, and delivery. It can be helped by:

Improving each processing step's efficiency through minimizing waste, quickly resolving any bottlenecks.
Applying production leveling (Heijunka) to both supply chain management and production process steps.
Automating all possible actions along the process.
Reducing the length of the idle (waiting) process stages, as these are often the most wasteful and can be the easiest ones to tackle for a start.

Order lead time
When talking about Order Lead Time (OLT) it is important to differentiate between the definitions that may exist around this concept. Although they look similar, there are differences between them that help the industry to model the order behavior of their customers. The four definitions are : 
The Actual Order Lead Time  (OLTActual) The order lead-time, refers to the time which elapses between the receipt of the customer's order (Order Entry Date) and the  delivery of the goods." 
The Requested Order Lead Time  (OLTRequested) represents the time between the Order Entry Date and the customer requested delivery date; this measurement could help the company to understand the order behavior of the customers and help to design profitable models to fulfill customer needs.Silva, L., 2013, "Supply Chain Contract Compliance Measurements" Master thesis (work in progress), Aalto University, Finland.
The Quote Order Lead Time  (OLTQuote) is the agreed  time between the Order Entry Date and the supplier's committed deliver date of goods as stipulated in a supply chain contract.
The Confirmed Order Lead Time (OLTConfirmed) represents the time between the Order Entry Date and the by the supplier confirmed'' delivery date of goods.

OLT formulas 
OLTRequested = Wish Date – Order Entry Date
The OLTRequested will be determined by the difference between the date the customer wants the material in his facilities (wish date) and the date when they provided its order to the supplier. 
OLTQuote = Quote Date – Order Entry Date
The OLTQuote will be determined by the difference between the date the customer agree to receive the material in their facilities (Quote date) and the date when the order is provided to the supplier.
OLTActual = Delivery Date – Order Entry Date
The OLTActual will be determined by the difference between the day the provider deliver the material (Delivery date) and the date when they enter the order in the system. 
OLTConfirmed = Confirmed Date – Order Entry Date
The OLTConfirmed will be determined by the difference between the date the confirmed date by the provider to deliver the material in the customer facilities (Confirmed date) and the date when they provide the order to the supplier.

Average OLT based on volume
The Average OLT based on Volume (OLTV) is the addition of all the multiplications between the volume of product we deliver (quantity) and the OLT divided by the total quantity delivered in the period of time we are studying for that specific facility.
 
By doing this the company will be able to find a relation of volume weighted between the quantities of material required for an order and the time requested to accomplish it. The volume metric could be applied to the 4 types of OLT. 
The figure obtained from this calculation will be the average time (e.g. in days) between order placing and the requested delivery date of a specific customer under consideration of the average quantities ordered during that particular time.

Potential application areas for order lead time measurement
The correct analysis of OLT will give the company:
Better understanding of the market behavior making it able to develop more profitable schemas that fit better with customer needs (Revenue Management).
Increases company ability to detect and correct any behavior that is not within terms agreed in the contract (by penalization or different contract schema).  
The OLT measurement creates an opportunity area to improve the customer relations by increasing the level of communication with them.

Project management
In project management lead time is the time it takes to complete a task or a set of interdependent tasks. The lead of the entire project would be the overall duration of the critical path for the project.

Lead time is also the saved time by starting an activity before its predecessor is completed.

According to the PMBOK (4th edition) by PMI, lead is a dependency between two activities. An example would be scheduling the start of a 2-week activity dependent with the finish of the successor activity with a lead of 2 weeks so they will finish at the same time.

Journalism
Lead time in publishing describes the amount of time that a journalist has between receiving a writing assignment and submitting the completed piece. Depending on the publication, lead times can be anything from a couple of hours to many months/years.

Medicine
Lead time (when referring to a disease) is the length of time between detection of a disease through screening and the moment in time where it would have normally presented with symptoms and led to a diagnosis. An example of this is seen with breast cancer population screening, where women who are asymptomatic have a positive test result with mammography, whereas the underlying disease would have taken many more years to manifest.

Video games
Lead time in video games can refer to the amount of time certain special, important actions in high-twitch action games, such as using health-recovering items, may need to take in order to be completed successfully.  Lead time can be used to prevent players from abusing helpful abilities or items by making them a little more difficult to use safely, requiring some strategy, risk or caution.

See also
Time limit
Safety stock
Latency (engineering)

References

Publishing
Lean manufacturing
Business planning